Stigmella plagicolella is a moth of the family Nepticulidae. It is found in all of Europe (except Iceland and Norway) and the Near East.

The wingspan is 4–5 mm. The thick erect hairs on the head vertex are orange and the collar dark bronze fuscous-white. Antennal eyecaps are whitish. Forewings are shining deep purplish-bronze ; a shining whitish fascia beyond middle ; apical area beyond this dark purple-fuscous Hindwings are grey.

Adults are on wing from May to June and again in August.

The larvae feed on Malus domestica, Prunus armeniaca, Prunus avium, Prunus cerasifera, Prunus cerasifera var. pissardii, Prunus domestica, Prunus domestica insititia, Prunus mahaleb, Prunus mume, Prunus spinosa, Prunus subcordata and Prunus triloba. They mine the leaves of their host plant. The first part of the mine consists of a slender corridor with a wide uninterrupted frass line. After a moult this corridor abruptly widens into a blotch. Pupation takes place outside of the mine.

References

External links
 Plant Parasites of Europe
 UKmoths
 Swedish moths
 Stigmella plagicolella images at  Consortium for the Barcode of Life
lepiforum.de

Nepticulidae
Moths described in 1854
Moths of Asia
Moths of Europe
Taxa named by Henry Tibbats Stainton